
Zarer (also spelled Zarir, Zariadres and Zareh) was a Sasanian prince who attempted to seize the throne from his brother Balash in 485. He only appears in the work of the contemporary Armenian historian Ghazar Parpetsi. After the death of Peroz I, Balash was elected as king by the nobility and clergy. Zarer, dissatisfied with the election, rebelled. Balash was thus forced to make peace with his enemy Vahan Mamikonian and sent him at the head of an army to suppress the rebellion of Zarer. Zarer was shortly defeated, and fled to the mountains, but was quickly captured and "shot down like an animal".

References

Bibliography

Ancient works 
 Ghazar Parpetsi, History of the Armenians.

Modern works 
 
 
 
 
 

Sasanian princes
485 deaths
5th-century Iranian people
Rebellions against the Sasanian Empire
People executed by the Sasanian Empire
Year of birth unknown